"Bon, Bon" is a song by Cuban-American rapper Pitbull from his fifth studio album, Armando. It was released as the album's third official single on August 27, 2010. It heavily uses portions of the song "We No Speak Americano" by Yolanda Be Cool & DCUP, a hit earlier in the year, but it was later known that the version of "We No Speak Americano" used was a bootleg remix done by DJ Alvaro. Pitbull later gave credit to Alvaro and promised that they were looking forward to making more songs together. It samples the 1956 Italian song "Tu vuò fà l'americano" by Renato Carosone. The single peaked at number 61 on the US Billboard Hot 100 and number three on the US Top Latin Songs.

Music video
The official music video was released onto Pitbull's official Vevo channel on March 22, 2011. It features Pitbull with model Shanna Corrina and special guest stars like Nayer, Sophia Del Carmen and Sagia Castañeda who appeared in the "I Know You Want Me (Calle Ocho)" music video. Madai makes a cameo appearance in the video. The video has received over 177 million views.

Track listing
"Bon, Bon" (Album Version) – 3:35
"Bon, Bon" (Radio Edit) – 3:06
"Bon, Bon" (English Version) – 3:36
Source:

Credits and personnel
Armando C. Perez – songwriter
Nicola Salerno - songwriter, arranger, instrumentation, recording and mixing
DJ Alvaro - producer, keyboards, arranger, instrumentation, recording and mixing
Johnson Peterson - songwriter
Sylvester Martinez - songwriter
Duncan MacLellan - songwriter

Source:

Charts

Weekly charts

Year-end charts

Certifications

References

2010 singles
2010 songs
Pitbull (rapper) songs
Songs written by Nicola Salerno
Songs written by Pitbull (rapper)
Sony Music Latin singles
Spanish-language songs
Ultra Music singles